The Triumph of the Scarlet Pimpernel is a 1928 British silent costume drama film directed by T. Hayes Hunter and starring Matheson Lang, Juliette Compton and Nelson Keys. It was based on the 1922 novel The Triumph of the Scarlet Pimpernel by Baroness Emma Orczy. It was made at Cricklewood Studios, with art direction by Clifford Pember.

Madeleine Carroll was meant to play Lady Blakeney but filming was delayed and proved unavailable.

Cast
 Matheson Lang as Sir Percy Blakeney
 Juliette Compton as Theresa Cabbarrus
 Nelson Keys as Robespierre
 Marjorie Hume as Lady Blakeney
 Haddon Mason as Tallien
 Douglas Payne as Rateau
 Harold Huth as St. Just

References

Bibliography
 Low, Rachael. History of the British Film, 1918-1929. George Allen & Unwin, 1971.

External links

1928 films
British historical drama films
British silent feature films
1920s historical drama films
Films based on British novels
Scarlet Pimpernel films
Films set in England
Films set in France
Films set in the 18th century
Films set in the 1790s
Films shot at Cricklewood Studios
British black-and-white films
British and Dominions Studios films
Films based on works by Emma Orczy
Cultural depictions of Maximilien Robespierre
1928 drama films
1920s English-language films
1920s British films
Silent drama films
Silent adventure films